Twin Buttes may refer to one of the following:

 Twin Buttes, Arizona, a ghost town in Pima County, Arizona
 Twin Buttes (California), volcanic cinder cones in California
 Twin Buttes, North Dakota, an unincorporated community in Dunn County, North Dakota
 Twin Buttes Reservoir, an artificial lake in Texas

See also
 Twin Butte, Alberta